"Perdido Sin Ti" is a song recorded by Puerto Rican singer Ricky Martin for his fourth studio album, Vuelve (1998). The song was written by K.C. Porter, Robi Rosa, and Luis Gómez Escolar, while the production was handled by Porter and Rosa. It was released by Columbia Records as the fourth single from the album on August 18, 1998. A heart-wrenching, slow ballad, its protagonist is nostalgia. The song received positive reviews from music critics, who complimented its "sweetness" and "dreamy hook".

"Perdido Sin Ti" was acknowledged as an award-winning song at the 2000 BMI Latin Awards. The song reached number one on Billboards Hot Latin Songs and Latin Pop Airplay charts in the United States, as well as number three in both Panama and Puerto Rico. The accompanying music video was directed by Gustavo Garzón and premiered at the Wolfsonian Museum in October 1998. The track was included on the set lists for Martin's the One Night Only with Ricky Martin tour and the Movimiento Tour.

Background and composition

In 1995, Ricky Martin released his third studio album, A Medio Vivir. On it, he shifted from his traditional ballad-style compositions to a riskier fusion of music focused on traditional Latin sounds, epitomized by the song "María". Taken aback by the starkly different musical style, his record label executives felt the song would ruin Martin's career. Despite this, "María" was chosen as the album's second single and became a breakthrough hit, reaching number one in France, Spain, Germany, Belgium, Holland, Switzerland, Finland, Italy, Turkey, and the whole of South America. As of 2014, A Medio Vivir had sold over three million copies worldwide. While on tour in 1997, Martin returned to the studio and began recording material for his fourth studio album. He said the experience of touring and recording at the same time was "brutal and incredibly intense". On December 7, 1997, Martin confirmed he was completing his next project and that the album would be released in February of the following year. He worked on the album with producers K.C. Porter and Robi Rosa, and recorded it in studios across the United States, Puerto Rico, and Spain.

The album's title, Vuelve, was announced on January 25, 1998. In an interview with CNN en Español, he emphasized the album was going to "reaffirm the internationalization of my career and I know that it will help me a lot to destroy the stereotypes that may exist with my culture". The album consisting mainly of "red-hot" Latin dance numbers and "melodramatic" pop ballads.
"Perdido Sin Ti" was written by Porter, Rosa, and Luis Gómez Escolar, and runs for a total of four minutes and ten seconds. An "aching, slower-placed" ballad, in which nostalgia is the protagonist. In the lyrics, he cites "No me dejes solo quédate en mi casa, sin ti me falta todo, sin ti no queda nada" ("Don't leave alone, stay in my house, I'd lack everything without you, nothing remains you").

Release and promotion

"Perdido Sin Ti" was released on August 18, 1998, as the album's fourth single. The song was also later added to Martin's compilation albums La Historia (2001), Personalidad (2015), and Esencial (2018). The track was included as the ninth track on Martin's fourth studio album, Vuelve, released February 12, 1998. The European maxi-single for "Perdido Sin Ti" includes "Entre el Amor y los Halagos" taken from Martin's second studio album, Me Amaras (1993), as well as "Vuelo" and "Susana" from his debut studio album, Ricky Martin (1991). The accompanying music video was directed by Argentine director Gustavo Garzón, and premiered in October 1998 at the Wolfsonian Museum in Miami. Martin uploaded the visual on Facebook Watch on October 15, 2019. "Perdido Sin Ti" was included as part of the setlists for the One Night Only with Ricky Martin tour and the Movimiento Tour. A live version of "Perdido Sin Ti" was recorded and taped as part of his MTV Unplugged set in Miami, Florida on August 17, 2006.

Reception
"Perdido Sin Ti" was met with positive reviews from music critics. John Lannert of Billboard magazine mentioned the track as one of the album's potential hits. Writing for Vista magazine, Carmen Teresa Roiz remarked that the song, along with "Casi un Bolero" and "Corazonado, "reflects the most intimate part of the interpreter". The Newsday critic Richard Torres praised the track's "sweetness". The Dallas Morning News reviewer Mario Tarradell labeled it "a bedroom staple with a dreamy hook and a simmering feel". An author of Crónica TV named "Perdido Sin Ti" among Martin's "most important songs" and Melissa Martinez from the El Paso Times named it as one of her favorites. In 2015, Univision staff ranked the track as Martin's seventh-best ballad. The following year, Marco Salazar Nuñez from E! Online placed it on an unranked list of "9 Ricky Martin songs perfect to liven up your own wedding", stating: "A wedding is not a wedding without the romantic dance." It was acknowledged as an award-winning song at the 2000 BMI Latin Awards.

The track peaked at number three in both Panama and Puerto Rico. In the United States, "Perdido Sin Ti" debuted at number 28 on the Billboard Hot Latin Songs on the week of September 5, 1998. The single reached on top of the chart two weeks later, succeeding "Tu Sonrisa" by Elvis Crespo, becoming Martin's second number one on the chart. It was replaced by Carlos Ponce's song "Decir Adios" the following week. The track also reached the top of the Latin Pop Airplay subchart, displacing Martin's own "Vuelve" making him the first artist on the chart's history to replace himself; it spent a total of two weeks in this position.

Formats and track listings

European CD single
"Perdido Sin Ti" – 4:10
"Entre el Amor y los Halagos" – 4:20

European CD maxi-single
"Perdido Sin Ti" (Radio Edit) – 4:03
"Entre el Amor y los Halagos" – 4:20
"Vuelo" – 3:58
"Susana" – 4:54

Mexican promotional CD single
"Perdido Sin Ti" – 4:10

Credits and personnel
Credits are adapted from Tidal.

 Ricky Martin vocal, associated performer
 K.C. Porter composer, lyricist, producer, piano
 Robi Rosa composer, lyricist, producer, background vocal, recording engineer
 Luis Gómez Escolar composer, lyricist
 David Campbell arranger
 Jeff Shannon assistant engineer
 Jorge M. Jaramillo assistant engineer
 Juan Rosario assistant engineer
 Jules Condar assistant engineer, recording engineer
 Kieran Murray assistant engineer
 Rafa Sardina assistant engineer
 Robert Valdez assistant engineer
 Scott Kieklak assistant engineer
 Teresa Cassin assistant engineer
 Paul Gordon assistant engineer
 Bill Smith assistant engineer
 Luis Villanueva assistant engineer
 Alberto Pino assistant engineer
 Dave Dominguez assistant engineer
 Francisco "Panchoî" assistant engineer
 Tomaselli assistant engineer
 Gene Lo assistant engineer
 Iris Salazar assistant engineer
 Julia Waters background vocal
 Phil Perry background vocal
 Ricky Nelson background vocal
 John West background vocal
 Darryl Phinnessee background vocal
 Josie Aiello background vocal
 Oren Waters background vocal
 Carmen Twillie background vocal
 Stefanie Spruill background vocal
 James Gilstrap background vocal
 Kristle Murden background vocal
 Marlena Jeter background vocal
 Bunny Hill background vocal
 GB Dorsey background vocal
 Jackeline Simley background vocal
 Katrina Harper background vocal
 Martonette Jenkins background vocal
 Maxine Jeter background vocal
 Phillip Ingram background vocal
 Reggie Hamilton bass
 Curt Bisquera drums
 Michael Landau electric guitar
 Leo Herrera mixing engineer
 Bobby Rothstein mixing engineer
 Chris Brooke mixing engineer
 Jun Murakawa mixing engineer
 Luis Quiñe mixing engineer
 Mike Ainsworth mixing engineer
 Tony Pelusso mixing engineer
 Mike Aarvold mixing engineer
 Travis Smith mixing engineer
 Chris Carroll mixing engineer
 Todd Keller mixing engineer
 Randy Waldman piano
 John Beasley piano
 Esteban Villanueva project coordintor, recording engineer
 Iris Aponte project coordintor
 Sarah Wykes project coordintor
 Steve Churchyard recording engineer
 John Lowson recording engineer
 Ted Stein recording engineer
 Robert Fernandez recording engineer
 Brian Jenkins recording engineer
 Doc Wiley recording engineer
 Benny Faccone recording engineer
 Carlos Nieto recording engineer
 Charles Dye recording engineer
 Danny Vicari recording engineer
 Femio Hernandez recording engineer
 Héctor Iván Rosa recording engineer
 Jeff Poe recording engineer
 Jesus "Chuy" Flores recording engineer
 John Karpowich recording engineer
 Karl Cameron recording engineer
 Keith Rose recording engineer
 Luis Fernando Soria recording engineer
 Matt Ross Hyde recording engineer
 Peter McCabe recording engineer
 Rik Pekkonen recording engineer

Charts

Release history

See also
List of number-one Billboard Hot Latin Tracks of 1998
List of Billboard Latin Pop Airplay number ones of 1998

References

1998 songs
1998 singles
1990s ballads
Ricky Martin songs
Spanish-language songs
Songs written by K. C. Porter
Sony Discos singles
Song recordings produced by K. C. Porter
Songs about nostalgia
Songs written by Luis Gómez Escolar
Songs written by Draco Rosa